Kentucky Route 185 is a north–south state highway traversing four counties in west-central Kentucky.

Route description

|- 
| Warren
| 
|- 
| Butler/Edmonson 
| 
|- 
| Grayson 
|   
|-
|Total
|
|} 

KY 185 begins on Gordon Avenue at a junction with the concurrently running US 68/KY 80 just north of downtown Bowling Green. After crossing the Barren River, it continues north to intersect KY 526 and KY 263 just southeast of Richardsville before passing through Anna.

Immediately after its junction with KY 1749, KY 185 bridges the Green River upon entry into the easternmost portion of Butler County near Reedyville. Just before entering the northwestern portion of Edmonson County, KY 185 crosses KY 70 at an all-way intersection in the community of Roundhill.

After this junction, KY 185 continues north, crossing the Butler-Edmonson County line three times on its way to the Big Reedy community. It then passes into Grayson County, where it traverses the Western Kentucky Parkway via an overpass, shortly before reaching its northern terminus in the city of Caneyville at a junction with US 62 and KY 79.

History
KY 185 originally crossed the Green River by way of Honaker's Ferry until 1962, when KY 185 was rerouted onto the Elmer White Bridge.

KY 185's run within Warren County was originally Kentucky Route 67 from the 1930s until the discontinuation of the Bear Creek Ferry around 1967/68. KY 185's original south end was just west of Glenmore. The original KY 67 ran KY 185's present routing in Warren County, goes northeast to meet the ferry and enters Edmonson County near Segal and ended at Windyville, Kentucky at a junction with KY 70. The ferry provided a more direct route from Bowling Green to western Edmonson County. In the early 1950s, KY 185 was extended to follow a path from the Glenmore area to a junction with U.S. Route 31W at Bristow, near the present-day location of Warren East High School. After the decommissioning of the Bear Creek Ferry and KY 67, KY 185 in Warren County was rerouted to its current routing. In 2002, the current Kentucky Route 67 was redesignated to follow the Industrial Parkway in Boyd and Greenup Counties in northeastern Kentucky just west of Ashland.

From 1967/68 until around 2010, KY 185's southern terminus was at US 68's junction with Kentucky Route 234 near the L&N Depot in Bowling Green. KY 185 ends at its current south terminus when US 68/KY 80 was rerouted onto the Vietnam Veterans Blvd (originally KY 880), and the other US 68 alignment was re-designated as US Route 68 Business.

Major intersections

Points of interest along route
Shanty Hollow Lake near Anna (Ky. Dept. Of Fish & Wildlife) 
The Corner Market at Roundhill

References

External links
Kentucky Route 185 News

0185
0185
0185
0185
0185